Fiddaun Castle is a tower house in Tubber, County Galway, close to the border of County Clare in Ireland. It is a National Monument of Ireland.

Name
Fiodh Duin means "wood of the fort" in Irish.

Geography
Fiddaun Castle is situated between Lough Doo and Lough Aslaun near the modern village of Tubber.

History
Fiddaun is a mid-16th century Irish tower house in the Kiltartan barony of the Uí Fiachrach Aidhne, one of four O'Shaughnessy castles. 

Fiddaun was most likely built by Sir Roger Gilla Dubh Ó Seachnasaigh, as he is the first mentioned living there and it is not known before his time.

Today
This tower house is most noted for its well preserved inner bawn wall. It is located on private land and maintained by the Office of Public Works.

References

Castles in County Galway
Ruins in the Republic of Ireland
National Monuments in County Galway
O'Shaughnessy family